This is a list of hospitals in Egypt.

Cairo 
 57357
 Abdel Kader Fahmy Hospital
 Adam International Hospital (IVF&ICSI) 
 Ain Shams Specialized Hospital, Abbasia
 Ain Shams University Hospital (El Demerdash)
 Agooza Hospital
 Al Salam Hospital
 Alexandria Psychiatric centre
 Alzahra Hospital
 As Salam International Hospital of Alameda Health Care
 Amoun Hospital
 Anglo-American Hospital, Zamalek
 Arab Contractors Medical Center, Gabal Akhdar
 Asyout University Hospital
 Badran
 Behman Hospital, Maddi
 Cairo Institute of Radiology
 Cairo Kidney Center
 Cairo Medical Center, Heliopolis
 Cleopatra Hospital, Heliopolis
 Coptic Hospital
 Dar Al Fouad Hospital 
 Dar el Hekma Hospital "Nasr city"
 Dar el Salam General Hospital
 Dar el Oyoun Hospital
 Dar El Teb Diagnostic Center
 Dar El Teb IVF Center
 Dar El Shefa Hospital
 Demerdash Hospital
 Egyptian Medical Services Co. (EMS) - Cairo Dialysis Center
 Egyptian Medical Services Co. (EMS) - Sharm El Sheikh Dialysis Center
 Egyptian Medical Services Co. (EMS) - Hurghada Dialysis Center
 El Borg Hospital
 El Fayrouz Hospital
 El Ganzouri Specialized Hospital
 El Galaa Hospital
 El Gomhoureyaa Hospital
 El Kablat Hospital
 El Kateb - Cairo Hospital
 Elixir Gastro-hepatic care center, Mohandsin, Giza (Alameda Medical Care Corporate)
 El Madina Hospital - Cairo
 El Merghany Hospital
 El Mobarra MaadiHospital
 El Monera General Hospital
 El Nada Maternity Hospital
 El Nozha International Hospital, Heliopolis
 El Salam Hospital El Haram 
 El Safa Hospital
 El Shoruk Hospital
 El TawfiaiiaHospital
 Ebtihag Shafik Hospital
 Gohar Hospital & Women's Health Clinic
 Garden City Hospital
 Hassabo International Hospital
 Hayat Medical Center, Heliopolis
 Heliopolis Cardiac Center
 Hussein University Hospital
 Ibn Sina Hospital (Egypt), Dokki 
 International Medical Center Cairo
 Italian Hospita Cairo 
 Greek Hospital Cairo 
 Kasralainy Hospital
 Misr El Amal Hospital
 Misr International
 MISR Cancer Center
 Nasser General Hospital
 National Cancer Institute Egypt
 New Kasr El Aini Hospital
 New Cairo Hospital
 Nile Badrawi Hospital
 October 6 University (O6U) Hospital
 Red Crescent
 Roxy Hospital
 Saudi German Hospital SGH Cairo (150 Beds General Hospital)
 Shaalan Surgi Center
 Theodor Bilharz Research Institute
 Sheikh Zayed specialized Hospital
 Heliopolis Neuro-Center
 Zahraa University Hospital
Zohairy Hospital

Alexandria 
 Agial Hospital (Assisted Reproduction), Gynecologic Endoscopy, Obstetrics & Gynecology, NICU)
 Alexandria University Hospitals:
 Borg El Arab University Hospital
 Alexandria main University hospital (El Meery, koleyet el teb)
 El Shatby Pediatric
 El Shatby Gynaecology and Obstetrics
 El Hadara (Queen Nariman Hospital) for Orthopaedics and Neuropsychiatry
 Al Salama Al jadeeda Hospital
 Alex Radiology Center
 Alex Sidney Kiel (ASK)
 Agial Hospital
 Alexandria Pediatric Center
 Alexandria Medical Center
 Armed Forces
 Badrawy Hospital
 Coptic Hospital
 Dermatological
 Dar el Shefa'
 Dar Ismail (Obstetrics)
 Dar ELAraby Maternity Hospital
 Dr.Mahmoud Ghanem (Psychiatry)
 Dr. Hassab Hospital
 Dr. Ibrahim Obeid
 Dr. Mohamed Milad
 Dr. Mohamed Nabawi El Mohandes
 El-Yousser Medical Center
 Dr. Shalaby - Alexandria
 Al Helal Al Ahmar Hospital
 El Ahram
 El Amin El Kheireya - Alexandria
 El Anba Takla - Alexandria
 El Kabbari
 El Ma'moora Psychiatry Hospital
 El Madina El Tebbeya
 El Maleka Nazly Paediatric Hospital
 El Mowassah
 El Seguini (El Sammak Hospital)
 El Sherook
 El Thaghr Specialized
 Fevers (el homeyat)
 Farook Ophthalmology Hospital
 German Hospital
 Gamal Abdel Nasser Hospital
 Horus Vision Correction Center
 Mabarret El Asafra
 Maternity - Alexandria
 Miami Private
 Mohamed Ragab El Kheiry
 Mostashfa el Ozon
 Sayedaty for Gynaecology and Obstetrics
 Sharq el Madina
 Saudi German Hospital (SGH) - Alex West (150 general hospital beds)
 Sidi Bishr - Alexandria El Sekka
 Specialized Universal Network of Oncology (SUN) (Cancer Treatment and Screening Center)
 Victoria Hospital
 Alex Specialized Hospital (Obstetrics & Pediatrics)
 Hassab Hospital
 Victorya Hospital
 Siklam Hospital

Red Sea
 Alkawther Hospital
 The Egyptian Hospital
 Red Sea Hospital
 Port Ghalib Hospital

Mansoura
 Al-Hekma Neurology, Neurosurgery and Advanced Surgeries Hospital
 Mansoura Medical Center
 Mansoura University Hospitals

South Sinai Governorate 
 Sharm International Hospital

Zagazig

Ministry of Health and Population hospitals
Zagazig General Hospital - Elhokamaa
Zagazig General Hospital - El Ahrar
El Kenayate District Hospital
El Mabarah-Hospital - Health Insurance Organization
Chest Hospital (Egypt)
Fever Hospital
Ophthalmic Hospital

Private hospitals
Al Salam Hospital
Fatih MediPlex Hospital
Al Haramain Specialized Hospital
Anwar Al Haramain Hospital
Al Taisseir Specialized Hospital
Gawish Medical Center
Al Goumhoria Hospital
Aldar Hospital, Zagazig
El Sharkia Eye Center
El Delta Abdel Latif Hospital
Alzakazik International Hospital
Al Obour Specialized Hospital
Al Fatah Specialized Hospital
Al Fredaws Specialized Hospital
Al Forkan Specialized Hospital
Al Montazah Specialized Hospital
Al Nil Hospital
Dr. Hamdy El Sayed Hospital
Khater Specialized Hospital
Saad Soliman Hospital
Hemida Medical Center Hospital
Makka Al Mokarrama Hospital
Nour Al Eslam Hospital
Waly For Surgery Hospital
South Sinai Hospital
Kepala Butuh

Zagazig University hospitals
Zagazig University hospitals include:
 Emergency – Istekbal - Hospital
 Pediatrics Hospital
 General Medicine Hospital
 Specialized Medicine Hospital
 Mubarak Hospital
 New Surgery Hospital
 Socialized Surgery-Assalam-Hospital
 Tumor & Oncology Hospital
 Accidents & Trauma Hospital
 Economic Treatment – Iktessady-Hospital

Specialized hospitals

Bone diseases 
As Salam International Hospital, Corniche El Nile, Maadi
National institute for neuromotor system Imbaba
Helal Hospital - Specializing in bone surgery

Eye Diseases 
 International Eye Hospital
 Clear Vision Laser Center
 Dr Khalil Eye Clinic, Eye of Cairo
 Rowad Eye Hospital - Cairo
 Dar el Oyoun Eye Hospital
 Research Institute of Ophthalmology, Giza
 Maghrabi Eye Hospital & Centers
 International Eye Center
 National Institute for Eye Diseases and Surgery
 Suzan Mubarak Center for Eye Tumor
 Mostafa Kamel Military Hospital - Alexandria
 German Hospital - Alexandria
 Sharkia Eye Center

Geriatric medicine 
 Ain Shams University Hospital (Geriatric Medicine Department and Geriatrics ICU)
 The International Medical Center (Cairo - Ismailia Desert Road)
 Palestine Hospital (Long Term Care)
 Center of Elderly Care (Helwan University)
 Boulaq Al-Dakror Hospital (Ministry of Health and Population)
 Al-Mataryia Hospital (Ministry of Health and Population)
 El-Sahel Hospital (Ministry of Health and Population)

Heart diseases 
 Dar Al Fouad Hospital (Heart clinic and surgery)
 As Salam International Hospital
 Nasser Institute for Search and Treatment, Cairo
 National Heart Institute (Egypt), Cairo-Imbaba, Kit Kat
International Medical Center (Cairo, Egypt), Cairo
 Mehalla Cardiac Center, Mehalla, Gharbiya
 Port-Said Cardiac Center, Port-Said
 Cairo Center for Heart Catheter (Cairo Cath)
 Heliopolis Heart Center - Heliopolois
 Cardioscan
 Alexandria Center for Heart Catheter
International Heart Center - Alexandria
 Elborg Hospital
 Ismailia Cardiac Center- Ismailia

Kidney diseases 
 Al Salam International Hospital, Corniche El Nile, Maadi
 Egyptian Medical Services Co. (EMS) - Cairo Dialysis Center
 Egyptian Medical Services Co. (EMS) - Sharm El Sheikh Dialysis Center
 Egyptian Medical Services Co. (EMS) - Hurghada Dialysis Center
 El Salam Hospital (kidney center)
 Kidney stones disintegration centers - ElKatteb Center
 The National Institute for kidney

Liver diseases 
 The National Institute for Liver Diseases (Menofya)
 International Center for Digestive System Diseases
 Theodor Bilharz Research Institute
 Elixir Gastro - Hepatic Care Center, Giza (Branch-1) (part of Alameda Medical Caree: Own As-Salam International Hospital (Kattameya International Hospital)

Obstetrics and gynecology
 Gohar Hospital & Women's Health Clinic

Parasitology 
 Theodor Bilharz Research Institute, Giza

Pediatrics 
 Abu El Reish Pediatrics Hospital
 Children Hospital, Assiut University

Psychiatric 
 Heliopolis Psychiatric Hospital
 Abbassia Psychiatric Hospital, Ministry of Health
 Behman Psychiatric Hospital
 Aldar Hospital, Zagazig
 Maamora Psychiatric Hospital, Ministry of Health
 Khanka Psychiatric Hospital, Ministry of Health
 Helwan Psychiatric Hospital, Ministry of Health
 Port Said Psychiatric Hospital, Ministry of Health
 Asiut Psychiatric Hospital, Ministry of Health
 Psychological Medicine Hospital - Dr. Adel Sadek
 Dr.Omar Shaheen Psychiatric Hospital
 Maadi Palace for Psychometrics
 Al Mokkatum Hospital
 Abu el-Azayem Psychiatric Hospital
 Rehab Hospital
 Dr. Gamal Aboul Azayem Psychiatric Hospitals
 Sleep Care Clinic (Sleep Disorders Center)
 Al Mashfa Psychiatric Hospital and Resort

Psychogeriatrics 
 Abbassia Psychiatric Hospital, Ministry of Health
 Psychological Medicine Hospital - Dr. Adel Sadek
 Psychometrics - Behman Psychiatric Hospital
 Dr. Omar Shaheen Psychiatric Hospital
 Maadi Palace for Psychometrics
 Al Mokkatum Psychiatric Hospital
 Rehab Hospital

Sleep medicine 
 Cairo Center for Sleep Disorders (CairoSleep)
 Sleep Care Clinic (Center for Sleep Disorders and Sleep Medicine)
Elixir Gastro - Hepatic Care Center, Giza (Branch-1) (Part of Alameda Medical Care Corporate: Own As-Salam International Hospital - Kattameya International Hospital)

Tumors 
 Alfacure Oncology Center
 National Cancer Institute (Egypt)
 Syzium Center Kasser el Eini
 Egypt International Center
 As Salam International Hospital, Corniche El Nile, Maadi
 57357 Children's Cancer Hospital Foundation

Weight reduction 
 Elixir Gastro-hepatic care center, Giza (Branch-1) (Part of Alameda Medical Care Corporate: Own As-Salam International Hospital - Kattameya International Hospital)

References

Hospitals
Egypt
Egypt
Hospitals